Philippe Joseph Sands, KC (born 17 October 1960) is a British and French writer and lawyer at 11 King's Bench Walk and Professor of Laws and Director of the Centre on International Courts and Tribunals at University College London. A specialist in international law, he appears as counsel and advocate before many international courts and tribunals, including the International Court of Justice, the International Tribunal for the Law of the Sea, the European Court of Justice, the European Court of Human Rights and the International Criminal Court.

Sands serves on the panel of arbitrators at the International Centre for the Settlement of Investment Disputes (ICSID) and the Court of Arbitration for Sport (CAS).

He is the author of seventeen books on international law, including Lawless World (2005) and Torture Team (2008). His book East West Street: On the Origins of Genocide and Crimes against Humanity (2016) has been awarded numerous prizes, including the 2016 Baillie Gifford Prize for Non-Fiction, and has been translated into 24 languages. His latest books are The Ratline: Love, Lies and Justice on the Trail of a Nazi Fugitive (2020) about Otto Wächter and The Last Colony: A Tale of Exile, Justice and Britain's Colonial Legacy (2022) about Chagos.

Since 5 February 2018 Sands has served as President of English PEN.

Early life
Sands was born in London on 17 October 1960 to Jewish parents. He was educated at University College School in Hampstead, London, and read Law at Corpus Christi College, Cambridge, attaining a BA in 1982 and going on to achieve first-class honours in the LLM course a year later. After completing his postgraduate studies at Cambridge, Sands spent a year as a visiting scholar at Harvard Law School.

Academic career
From 1984 to 1988 Sands was a Research Fellow at St Catharine's College, Cambridge, and the Cambridge University Research Centre for International Law (now the Lauterpacht Centre for International Law). He has also held academic positions at King's College London (1988–1993) and SOAS (1993–2001). He was a Global Professor of Law at New York University Law School (1993–2003) and has held visiting positions at Paris I (Sorbonne), University of Melbourne, the Graduate Institute of International and Development Studies, Indiana University Bloomington, University of Toronto, Boston College Law School and Lviv University.

In 2019 he was appointed the Samuel and Judith Pisar Visiting Professor of Law at Harvard Law School.

Sands was the co-founder of the Centre for International Environmental Law (1989) and the Project on International Courts and Tribunals (1997).

Legal career
Sands was called to the Bar of England and Wales in 1985. In 2000 he was a founding member of Matrix Chambers and was appointed Queen's Counsel in 2003. Sands was elected a Bencher of Middle Temple in 2009. He joined 11 King's Bench Walk on 1 October 2022.

Sands has acted as counsel and advocate in cases that span a wide range of subject areas, including:
 maritime boundary disputes (in the Caribbean, Atlantic and Pacific Oceans);
 claims relating to natural resources, pollution and environmental assessment;
 international trade disputes;
 issues relating to the immunity of serving and former heads of State from the jurisdiction of national and international courts;
 claims under the United Nations Convention on the Law of the Sea; 
 claims relating to the use of force, allegations of torture, genocide, self-determination and other violations of human rights;
 claims relating to violations of international criminal law.

Sands has acted as counsel in more than two dozen cases at the International Court of Justice, including the Nuclear Weapons Advisory Opinion (counsel for the Solomon Islands); the Georgia v. Russia dispute (counsel for Georgia); Whaling in the Antarctic (counsel for Australia); Legal Consequences of the Separation of the Chagos Archipelago from Mauritius in 1965; and Application of the Genocide Convention on the Prevention and Punishment of the Crime of Genocide (counsel for The Gambia). He has also been instructed in inter-State arbitrations, including the Chagos Marine Protected Area Arbitration (counsel for Mauritius) and the dispute between the Philippines and China over maritime jurisdiction in the South China Sea (counsel for the Philippines).

Prior to accepting appointments as ICSID arbitrator (since 2007), Sands acted as counsel in ICSID and other investment cases (including Tradex, Waste Management and Vivendi). Sands now sits as arbitrator in investment disputes and in sports disputes (CAS).

In 2005, Sands' book Lawless World catalysed legal and public debate in the UK on the legality of the 2003 Iraq War. The book addresses a range of topics including the Pinochet trial in London, the creation of the International Criminal Court, the War on Terror and the establishment of the detention camp at Guantánamo Bay. In the second edition of Lawless World (2006) Sands revealed that the then UK Prime Minister Tony Blair had told President George W. Bush that he would support US plans to invade Iraq before he had sought legal advice about the invasion's legality. Sands exposed a memorandum dated 31 January 2003 that described a two-hour meeting between Blair and Bush, during which Bush discussed the possibility of luring Saddam Hussein's forces to shoot down a Lockheed U-2 reconnaissance aircraft, an act that would cause Iraq to be in breach of UN Security Council Resolutions.

The memo disclosed that Blair told Bush that he would support US plans to go to war in the absence of a second UN Security Council Resolution, apparently contradicting an assurance given by Blair in the UK Parliament shortly afterwards on 25 February 2003. Sands has maintained the view that there was no basis in international law for military action in Iraq.

Sands' 2008 book Torture Team sets out in detail the role of senior lawyers in the Bush administration in authorising torture (including so-called ‘enhanced interrogation techniques’ at Guantánamo Bay). As a result of his work on Torture Team, Sands was invited to give oral and written evidence to the UK and Dutch Parliaments, as well as to the US House of Representatives and the US Senate:
 UK House of Commons Select Committee on Foreign Affairs (1 June 2004)
 UK House of Commons Select Committee on Foreign Affairs (April 2006)
 US House of Representative Committee on the Judiciary (6 May 2008)
 US Senate Committee on the Judiciary (19 June 2008)
 Dutch Parliamentary Inquiry: Davids Commission (September 2009)

In 2009 Jane Mayer reported in The New Yorker on Sands' reaction to news that Spanish jurist Baltazar Garzon had received motions requesting that six former Bush officials might be charged with war crimes.

From 2010 to 2012, he served as a Commissioner on the UK Government Commission on a Bill of Human Rights. The commission's Report was published in December 2012. Sands and Baroness Kennedy disagreed with the majority, and their dissent ("In Defence of Rights") was published in the London Review of Books.

Sands and Kennedy expressed concern that support for a UK Bill of Rights was motivated by a desire for the UK to withdraw from the European Convention of Human Rights. Writing in The Guardian in May 2015, Sands argued that plans for a British Bill of Rights could leave some people in the UK with more rights than others and that this would be "inconsistent with the very notion of fundamental human rights, in which every human being has basic minimum rights."

On 17 September 2015, Sands gave a public lecture at the UK Supreme Court entitled "Climate Change and the Rule of Law: Adjudicating the Future in International Law". He expressed the view that a ruling by an international judicial body, such as the International Court of Justice, could help resolve the scientific dispute on climate change and be authoritative and legally dispositive.

In December 2015, Sands (and two colleagues at Matrix Chambers) drafted a Legal Opinion on the legality of UK arms sales to Saudi Arabia for Amnesty International, Oxfam and Saferworld. The Opinion concluded that by authorising the transfer of weapons to Saudi Arabia, the UK government was acting in breach of its obligations under the Arms Trade Treaty, the EU Common Position on Arms Exports and the UK's Consolidated Criteria on Arms Exports.

On 16 April 2018, Sands co-authored a piece in The Times in which it is argued that the UK had no established legal basis for the 2018 missile strikes against Syria.

In November 2020, a panel of international lawyers chaired by Sands and Florence Mumba started drafting a proposed law criminalising ecocide, the destruction of ecosystems.

Writing, theatre and film
Sands is a contributor to the Financial Times and The Guardian and occasional contributor to the London Review of Books and Vanity Fair.

Sands frequently comments on issues of international law and is a contributor to BBC programmes, Sky News, CNN, Al Jazeera and national radio and TV stations around the world.

His written work has formed the basis for four staged productions exploring the public and historical impact of international law:
 Called to Account, a staged inquiry into the legal issues surrounding the Iraq War (performed at Tricycle Theatre in April 2007);
 Staged readings of Torture Team (performed at the Tricycle Theatre in 2009, Hay Festival in 2010, and the Long Wharf Theatre in 2011);
 A Song of Good and Evil (performed at South Bank's Purcell Room on 29–30 November 2014, Stockholm's Berwaldhallen on 14 January 2015, Nuremberg Courtroom 600 at the invitation of the German Government to mark 70th anniversary of the opening day of the Nuremberg Trials on 21 November 2015, and Montauban's Théâtre Olympe de Gouges on 28 November 2015). It has also been performed at Kings Place in London, and in Australia, Istanbul, Brussels, The Hague and New York.
 The Last Colony (performed in 2022 at the Avignon Festival and the Edinburgh International Book Festival).

Sands' book East West Street: On the Origins of Genocide and Crimes against Humanity (2016) has been translated into twenty languages. It formed the basis for the documentary My Nazi Legacy: What Our Fathers Did. The film is directed by David Evans and premiered in April 2015 at the Tribeca Film Festival. It was released in the US on 6 November 2015 and in the UK on 20 November 2015.

Sands wrote the script and appears in the film alongside two sons of prominent Nazi officials, Niklas Frank (the son of Hans Frank, the Governor-General of occupied Poland) and Horst von Wächter (the son of Otto Wächter, the Governor of Kraków in Poland and Galicia in Ukraine). The documentary, which explores the relationship between the two sons and their fathers, won the Yad Vashem Chairman's Award at the Jerusalem Film Festival and was nominated Best Documentary at the Stockholm Film Festival and at the Evening Standard British Film Awards.

In 2018, Sands wrote and presented the BBC Radio 4 documentary Intrigue: The Ratline about the disappearance of senior Nazi Otto Wächter, investigating the "ratlines" by which he escaped justice. Sands has since published a book on this topic.

In 2019, he published an Introduction to Franz Kafka's The Trial.

In 2020, he published The Ratline: Love, Lies and Justice on the Trail of a Nazi Fugitive.

In 2022, he published The Last Colony: A Tale of Exile, Justice and Britain's Colonial Legacy about Chagos.

Sands served for a number of years on the Board of the Tricycle Theatre and in 2018 was appointed President of English PEN (having served on the Board since January 2013). He is a member of the Board of the Hay Festival of Arts and Literature, and his interviews at Hay have included Julian Assange (2011); Vanessa Redgrave (2011); Keir Starmer (2013); John Le Carré (2013); Lord Justice Leveson (2014) and Tippi Hedren (2016).

Personal life
Sands lives in North London with his wife and three children. In a 2016 interview for The Guardian, Sands asserted: "I want to be treated as Philippe Sands individual, not Philippe Sands Brit, Londoner or Jew."

Bibliography

General
 Lawless World: America and the Making and Breaking of Global Rules (2005; Arabic edition in 2007; Farsi edition in 2008; Chinese edition in 2012; Turkish edition forthcoming in 2016)
 Torture Team: Rumsfeld's Memo and the Betrayal of American Values (2008; French edition in 2009)
 East West Street: On the Origins of Genocide and Crimes against Humanity (2016)
My Lviv (2016; together with Józef Wittlin's My Lwów, published as City of Lions)
The Ratline: Love, Lies and Justice on the Trail of a Nazi Fugitive, London: Weidenfeld and Nicolson, 2020.
La Filière, 10 podcasts, Radio France, France culture, 2021 
The Last Colony: A Tale of Exile, Justice and Britain's Colonial Legacy, London: Weidenfeld and Nicolson, 2022AcademicPrinciples of International Environmental Law (with Jacqueline Peel) (1995, 2003, 2012, 2019)International Law and Developing Countries: Essays in Honour of Kamal Hossain (ed. with Sharif Bhuiyan and Nico Schrijver) (2014)
 Hersch Lauterpacht, An International Bill of Rights (1945) (ed., with introduction) (2013)
 Selecting International Judges: Principle, Process and Politics (with Kate Malleson, Ruth Mackenzie and Penny Martin) (2010)
 The Manual of International Courts and Tribunals (ed. with Ruth Mackenzie, Cesare Romano, Yuval Shany), (2010)
 Bowett's Law of International Institutions (with Pierre Klein) (2001, 2009)
 Justice for Crimes against Humanity (ed. with Mark Lattimer) (2003)
 From Nuremberg to the Hague (ed.) (2003)
 Vers une transformation du droit international: Institutionnaliser le doute (2000)
 Environmental Law, The Economy and Sustainable Development (ed. with Richard Stewart and Richard Revesz) (2000)
 The International Court of Justice and Nuclear Weapons (ed. with Laurence Boisson de Chazournes) (1999)
 Greening International Law (ed.) (1993)
 The Antarctic and the Environment (ed. with Joe Verhoeven and Maxwell Bruce) (1992)
 Chernobyl: Law and Communication (1988)

Prizes and awards
 1999: Henri Rolin Medal for contribution to international law
 2005: Elizabeth Haub Prize for contribution to environmental law
 2015: Honorary Doctorate in law, University of Lincoln 
 2016: Baillie Gifford Prize for East West Street 2017: Jewish Quarterly-Wingate Prize for East West Street 2017: Honorary Doctorate in Law, University of East Anglia
 2017: British Book Awards, Non-Fiction Book of the Year
 2017: Prix du Meilleur Livre Etranger (Sofitel) for East West Street 2018: Prix Montaigne for East West Street 2018: Prix du Livre Européen for East West Street 2019: Honorary Doctorate, University of Leuven
 2019: Annetje Fels-Kupferschmidt prize
 2020: Elected Fellow, Royal Society of Literature
 2021: Grand Commander of the Order of the Star and Key of the Indian Ocean (GCSK)
 2022: Honorary Doctorate in Law, University of Liège
 2022: Honorary Doctorate in Theology, University of Lund
 2022: Honorary Doctorate in Law, University Jean Moulin Lyon 3
 2022: Academic Honoris Causa, Carta Academica
 2023: Prix de la Contre-Allée for The Last Colony''

References

External links

Philippe Sands official profile, UCL Faculty of Laws
Philippe Sands profile, 11 King's Bench Walk

"The Ratline" - BBC Podcast about Nazi escapes in World War II Europe, 18 September 2018.
"Philippe Sands’ speech at the 87th congress of PEN International, 2021". 20 September 2021.

1960 births
Living people
21st-century English lawyers
Academics of King's College London
Academics of University College London
Alumni of Corpus Christi College, Cambridge
British foreign policy writers
British Jewish writers
English Jews
English King's Counsel
Academic staff of the Graduate Institute of International and Development Studies
International law scholars
Members of Matrix Chambers
People educated at University College School
War on terror
Presidents of the English Centre of PEN